The ÖFB Ladies Cup is the annual cup competition of women's football teams in Austria. It is contested since 1972/73 and held by the ÖFB.

Format
There are five rounds to play. Entering are 32 teams, 10 from the ÖFB-Frauenliga and 22 from local federations. Round 1 is drawn on a local basis, after that all teams can meet each other. Additionally teams from the Frauenliga cannot be drawn against each other in round 1.

List of finals
The list of finals:

Titles by team

* Includes final(s) played and title(s) won as ASV Simacek Spratzern and FSK St. Pölten-Spratzern
** Includes final(s) played and title(s) won as Innsbrucker AC
*** Includes final(s) played and title(s) won as SG Alland–Brunn a. Geb.

References

External links
Ladies Cup at oefb.at
Cup at soccerway.com

Aus
Women's football competitions in Austria
Recurring sporting events established in 1980